Air Naval Gunfire Liaison Company (ANGLICO) is a Marine Corps Special Operations Capable Forces fire support and liaison unit of the United States Marine Corps. The mission of ANGLICO is "To provide Marine Air-Ground Task Force (MAGTF) Commanders a liaison capability to plan, coordinate, and conduct terminal control of fires in support of joint, allied, and coalition forces. Per this mission statement, ANGLICOs are not designed to support U.S. Marine Corps maneuver elements. Instead, the doctrinal purpose of ANGLICO is to provide fire support and coordination in support of units adjacent to the MAGTF.

Overview
The mission of ANGLICO is to plan, coordinate, and conduct terminal control of fires in support of joint, allied and coalition forces operating in, or adjacent to, the MAGTF battlespace. Although ANGLICO Marines are best known for their ability to control Close Air Support (CAS), they are equally well trained to employ ground and sea-based fires, to include cannon artillery, rocket artillery, precision guided munitions (such as GMLRS), and naval gunfire support.

ANGLICO Organization
Because ANGLICOs are designed to support non-USMC forces, they are divided into elements appropriate for each level of a foreign force's structure and include the following.

Company Headquarters (Division Cell)
The Division Cell serves as the senior USMC fires liaison between the MAGTF and the supported division headquarters.  This team is led by the Commanding Officer of the ANGLICO (a combat arms Lieutenant Colonel), the executive officer (often a Naval Aviator), and approximately 15 Marines and Sailors from the company staff.  Their equipment is geared towards planning and communication from a headquarters.  This is by no means a 'desk job,’ however.  During recent deployments to Afghanistan, company staffs have repeatedly engaged in direct combat with the enemy while visiting smaller teams.  Ad hoc Firepower Control Teams led by the JTACs and FACs at the company headquarters are also supported high-visibility operations.

Platoon (Brigade)
Often referred to as a "Brigade Platoon", this unit supports a brigade of friendly forces, and as such is led by a Major (artillery officer) and an experienced Gunnery Sergeant with an MOS of 0861/8002.   The staff is rounded out by an Air Officer (a Naval Aviator – usually a senior USMC captain) and a Naval Gunfire Liaison Officer (NGLO).  As with the company headquarters, this unit's equipment is geared toward command post operations vice tactical combat.  Brigade Platoon Marines frequently form ad hoc FCTs in support of specific operations, and serve as combat replacements/augments for SALTs and FCTs.  Because of their small size and the frequency with which they train together before deployments, Brigade Platoons develop distinct identities and tight knit relationships.  There are two Brigade Platoons in each active duty ANGLICO, and three Brigade Platoons in each reserve component ANGLICO.

Supporting Arms Liaison Team (Battalion)
The Supporting Arms Liaison Team (SALT) is designed to provide a comprehensive fire support coordination capability for a supported battalion.  A SALT consists of 18 Marines and Sailors: an eight-man SALT headquarters and two five-man FCTs. The SALT leader is a Naval Aviator on a ground tour as a Forward Air Controller (FAC). These Naval Aviators are usually mid to senior captains who have completed several deployments. The SALT Chief is a staff sergeant 0861/8002.  Though their primary missions is to provide fire support coordination to the supported battalion, the communications suite, planning capabilities, and experience of the SALT lends them well to "jump" COC operations and robust involvement in the non-fires operations of the supported battalion. Each active and reserve Brigade Platoon contains two SALTs.

Firepower Control Team (Company)
The Firepower Control Team (FCT – pronounced "Fict") is the basic unit of ANGLICO operations.  By the Table of Organization and Equipment (TO&E), there are two FCTs per SALT.  In practice, however, additional FCTs are often created based on the availability of Joint Terminal Attack Controllers (JTAC), with each FCT being led by a JTAC.  Because FCTs are frequently created on an ad hoc basis from the rest of the company, every scout observer and radio operator in ANGLICO is trained and prepared to serve on a FCT.  There is also historical precedent for highly motivated support Marines (logisticians, vehicle mechanics, etc.) within ANGLICO to be trained and employed on a FCT.

FCTs are led by junior to mid grade Captains, and sometimes Navy Lieutenants of the same grade, who are qualified JTACs.  While the TO&E allows for FCT leaders to hold any ground combat arms MOS, the vast majority of team leaders are artillery officers.  The team chief (0861) is a Sergeant, and usually is qualified as a Joint Fires Observer (JFO).  More experienced team chiefs frequently attend Tactical Air Control Party (TACP) school to obtain certification as a Joint Terminal Attack Controller (JTAC).   Team members include a senior radio operator (0621 Corporal or Sergeant, and frequently a JFO), a junior (PFC-LCpl) 0861, and a junior 0621.  Even this small team may be broken down further based on task organization, especially among MEU detachments.  FCTs frequently operate as two teams of 2–3 Marines each, and it is not unheard of for ANGLICO Marines to operate individually while supporting Special Operations Forces (SOF) raids or MEU operations such as Visit, board, search, and seizure (VBSS).

FCTs participate in ground combat operations alongside their supported unit, requesting and controlling air and fire support assets on the unit's behalf.  This entails detailed integration with friendly maneuver units (such as patrols and raids) and defensive operations.  Because of the team's experience and training, FCTs frequently advise supported company commanders on a broad range of fires and aviation related matters.  In the liaison role, MAGTF commanders use ANGLICO teams to understand their partnered units better. Similarly, the supported unit gains a better understanding of the operations of the adjacent MAGTF.

Battlefield environment
ANGLICO is never assigned its own physical battlespace as teams are constantly on the move. An ANGLICO inherits its AO from whichever unit it supports. A Firepower Control Team in Iraq, for example, consists of no more than four to five men. The fifth man is needed to man the gun turret during a vehicle mounted mission. The primary member is a Forward Air Controller (FAC) or a Joint Terminal Attack Controller (JTAC). A radio operator and artillery observer will compose two of the three remaining team members, with the last member often being a squad automatic weapon (SAW) gunner. Even though each team member has their own specialty, ANGLICO Marines are all cross-trained within their team. This high level of training and proficiency is what makes ANGLICO units so effective.

While ANGLICO units can perform many different tasks, Close Air Support has been its primary mission in recent conflicts. There are a limited number of JTACs in Iraq, and arguably the most sought out, are from Marine Corps ANGLICO units. The Marine Corps JTAC School is one of the most academically challenging schools within the military, with unusually high standards. To pass this school, a JTAC candidate must successfully coordinate 14 missions with live aircraft, and pass three intense written examinations.

ANGLICO teams have been working with all types of units in Iraq; from a typical Marine or Army infantry company to a SEAL or Iraqi Army unit. Their training at all levels allows them to easily be plugged into any environment. Most Iraqi units will have, on some level, an ANGLICO team assigned to them. Each year, ANGLICO teams train for several weeks with the British Commandos.

Training
ANGLICO units require Marines who are proficient in a wide variety of specialized military skills. In addition to their primary MOS training necessary to coordinate fire support, such as artillery fire support, field radio operations, direct air support operations, and naval gunfire spotting; Some Marines from both active and reserve component ANGLICOs receive airborne training and jump qualification at Fort Benning's Army Airborne School.  ANGLICO Marines regularly receive further advanced training in other insertion methods, fieldcraft, SERE, and other specialized and demanding activities. 

ANGLICO units can deploy as an entire company of 150 to support the large-scale operations of an entire Marine Expeditionary Force, or, more commonly, deploy in four to seven Marine and Sailor teams to support the activities of non-Marine units.

ANGLICO Basic Course (ABC)
Before deactivation in 1999, each ANGLICO ran their own in-house training program called ANGLICO Basic Course (ABC).  Historically, this was run by the Third Brigade Platoon, which was composed of Marines who had not yet passed ABC, and their instructional cadre.  Since re-activation, operational tempo has largely precluded the re-establishment of this practice.  Instead, "ABC-like" courses targeting the entire company have been held in order to solidify manning decisions and 'level the playing field' by giving all ANGLICO Marines (regardless of MOS) training in basic FCT skills.

2d ANGLICO re-instituted biannual ABCs in Spring 2013.  2d ANGLICO has four purposes for ABC: (1) Provide training and verification of a baseline skill level for all ANGLICO Marines, (2) Provide BDE platoon commanders/sergeants information IOT make informed team building decisions, (3) Foster unit cohesion and esprit de corps, and (4) Identify and train support Marines as combat replacements.

History

ANGLICO dates back to World War II and the island-hopping strategy in the Pacific Theater.  It was realized that there was a need to coordinate air, naval and artillery gunfire support between the Marines, Navy, Army, and other Allied forces. A Joint Assault Signal Company (JASCO) was created and attached to the 4th Marine Division.

The first use of JASCO was in the Marshall Islands campaign during the assault on Roi Namur. It was subsequently deployed in the Marianas campaign, for the capture of Tinian and Saipan.  The unit proved to be so effective that five other JASCOs were created. Perhaps the most famous JASCO is the 594th, for its actions during the Battle of Okinawa (1945) and the Philippines campaign (1944–45).

Following the reorganization of US armed forces in 1947, under the Department of Defense, the primary responsibility for liaison between seaborne fire support and ground forces was transferred to the Navy; consequently the JASCOs were disbanded.

However, in 1949, the Marine Corps began the process of recreating the capability, under the ANGLICO designation. The first such unit, ANGLICO, 2nd Signals Battalion, 2nd Marine Division, was formed in December, 1949 at Camp Lejeune, North Carolina. 1st Marine Division formed a similar unit at around the same time: ANGLICO, 1st Signal Battalion, 1st Marine Division. A third unit, 1st ANGLICO, Fleet Marine Force, Pacific, was activated on 2 March 1951 at Pearl Harbor, Hawaii. The ANGLICOs within 1st and 2nd Marine Divisions saw combat throughout 1950 and 1951 in the Korean War. Detachments from these units also saw combat attached to Republic of Korea Marine Corps battalions, and US Army units.

In May 1965, 1st ANGLICO activated Sub Unit One, for duty during the Vietnam War, in which the unit was continuously deployed for eight years. Sub Unit One's first commanding officer was LtCol George H. Albers. It was the only Marine Corps organization reporting directly to Military Assistance Command, Vietnam which assumed operational control of the sub unit in September 1966. Throughout its involvement in Vietnam Sub Unit One NGLO and TACP teams operated in all four tactical zones and was the last Fleet Marine Force unit to stand down from the war. Sub Unit One provided naval gunfire and close air in support of South Vietnamese Army and Marine units, South Korean Army and Korean Marine units, Australian Army, and New Zealand Army, as well as US Army and Marine combat formations. While only an estimated 1,350 men served the sub unit over those eight years they contributed in no small way to almost every combat operation of the war. In March 1972, naval gunfire spotters directing fire from the gunline ships of the US Navy provided the only counter-battery fire directed at North Vietnamese artillery that hit I Corps in advance of the Easter Offensive. Unit strength at that time was only 107 officers and men both Navy and Marine who with their backs to the wall made up the numbers deficit by tenaciously providing around the clock support.

In the late 1970s, under the leadership of LtCol James E. Toth, 2nd ANGLICO began experimenting with the concept of the "Universal Spotter": a Marine trained to coordinate and control fires from artillery, naval gunfire, and Close Air Support (CAS); previously the organization of ANGLICO, USMC artillery and infantry units provided separate shore fire control party teams, artillery liaison and tactical air control party teams for the observation and control of supporting arms for both USMC and other forces maneuver units.  The experimental concept relied on company level teams known as Firepower Control Teams (FCTs) containing personnel and equipment to control fires for all supporting arms and battalion level groups known as Supporting Arms Liaison Teams (SALTs) responsible for coordination of all supporting arms renabled 2nd ANGLICO to greatly reduce the number personnel required to support US Army and allied units and streamlined the request for and approval of the delivery of terminal control of USMC and USN supporting arms.  The Universal Spotter concept was later adopted by all ANGLICOs and was the forerunner of today's Joint Terminal Attack Controller (JTAC) and Joint Fires Observers (JFO).

The early 1980s saw ANGLICOs (particularly 2nd ANGLICO) operating at a high tempo; between June 1982 and March 1984, the company supported 35 operations with US Army and Allied nations, ranging from arctic operations in northern Norway, exercises in the Mediterranean, TACP support for USN carrier wings in the Caribbean and training operations with South American militaries. A 2nd ANGLICO SALT officer conducted naval gunfire spotting from an A-6 Intruder, the first time this had been done from this platform.

Also, despite having nearly a third of its strength engaged internationally, for the first time in its history 2nd ANGLICO deployed in support of 18th Airborne Corps for Operation Urgent Fury (Invasion of Grenada). This was also the first time an entire US Army Division, the 82nd Airborne Division was supported during combat operations.  2nd ANGLICO teams airlanded at Point Salines airfield with the division's first elements and controlled USN LTV A-7 Corsair II aircraft in close air support and assisted in deconflicting indirect fires from Army units.

During the mid-to-late 1980s, under LtCol J. M. Wills and LtGen A. M. Gray (later Commandant of the Marine Corps) 2nd ANGLICO went through a period of refocusing on core skills including regular live naval gunfire training with the  battleship, and more frequent mass tactical exercises with the Army's 82nd Airborne Division. Additionally, the 2nd ANGLICO began to train in Low Intensity Conflict response with weapon systems such as the Air Force AC-130 Spectre, Special Patrol Insertion/Extraction and Fast Rope insertion methods.

In 1999, all active-duty ANGLICO units (1st and 2d ANGLICO) were deactivated, their responsibilities transferred to less-effective Marine Liaison Elements. The two reserve units, 3rd and 4th ANGLICO, were the only ANGLICO units that remained (and to this day are the only ANGLICOs that retain their jump mission and status as "Goldwingers," a reference to the ANGLICO personnel being jump qualified and entitled to wear the Navy and Marine Corps Parachutist insignia. In 2003, amidst the US war in Iraq and Global War on Terror and a high operational tempo being demanded of the reserve ANGLICO units, 1st and 2d ANGLICO were reactivated (although their status as jump units has never returned). Shortly thereafter, in 2004, 5th ANGLICO was formed.

In 2008, ANGLICO began supporting combat operations in Helmand Province, Afghanistan, in support of Operation Enduring Freedom. A detachment from 2rd ANGLICO was sent as part of SMAGTF-A, and in 2009, the brigade platoon from 2rd, followed by a detachment from 1st ANGLICO and one from 3rd, joined the 2nd Marine Expeditionary Brigade.

In 2013, 6th ANGLICO was formed in Concord, California, with a third brigade platoon detachment at Joint Base Lewis-McChord, Washington. In 2018, 6th ANGLICO relocated the HQ and a brigade platoon to Joint Base Lewis-McChord, Washington. One of the command's three brigade platoons remains in Concord, California.

Current units
Six ANGLICOs currently exist in the U.S. Marine Corps:

Notable former members
Johnny Micheal Spann
Dan Sullivan
Owen West

See also

 United States Air Force Special Tactics Officer
 United States Air Force Combat Control Team
 148 (Meiktila) Battery Royal Artillery
 Organization of the United States Marine Corps

References

External links
 ANGLICO Association
 ANGLICO Hub Site 
Lightning From The Sky Thunder From The Sea by Thomas Petri
Storm on the Horizon by David J. Morris

Companies of the United States Marine Corps